Henry Peter Tewksbury (March 21, 1923 – February 20, 2003) was an American film and television director.

Biography
Born in Cleveland, he attended Dartmouth College but left to serve as a US Army captain in the Pacific during WWII.

Following the war he, then worked for radio KTIP in Porterville, California where he did almost every job at the station during a five-year stint. He also founded the Porterville Barn Theater in 1947 and becoming its director, and his reputation spread to Hollywood.

Television

When Father Knows Best  moved from radio to TV in 1954, he was hired to direct where he was awarded an Emmy Award about five years into the run of the program. He also produced and directed episodes of the Jackie Cooper series The People’s Choice.

In 1960 he directed My Three Sons. He left after the first season and together with a writer of the show's episodes, James Leighton, created, produced and directed It's a Man's World, a TV series aired from September 1962 to January 1963 that attracted a loyal following, but not sponsors.

Motion pictures
He directed Sunday in New York with Jane Fonda in 1963, Walt Disney's Emil and the Detectives in 1964 and a pair of Elvis Presley movies ("Stay Away Joe" and "Trouble with Girls".  Tewksbury collaborated with J.D. Salinger on a film adaptation of the author's "For Esmé—with Love and Squalor", which was never produced after a casting dispute between the two men.

Tewksbury directed several television pilots that morphed into made for TV movies; many were directed by a My Three Sons writer, A.J. Carothers.

Henry the Cheeseman
He moved between Vermont and California, where he managed a ranch near Cambria, California. In Vermont, he worked as a farmer, a miller of wheat and the founding teacher of an alternative school in an abandoned one-room schoolhouse before becoming a cheese expert where he authored The Cheeses of Vermont: A Gourmet Guide to Vermont's Artisanal Cheesemakers and became known as "Henry the Cheeseman", a legendary figure at the Brattleboro Food Co-op.

Film Credits
 Sunday in New York (1963)
 Emil and the Detectives (1964)
 Doctor, You've Got to Be Kidding! (1967)
 Stay Away, Joe (1968)
 The Trouble with Girls (And How To Get Into It) (1969)

Notes

External links
 
  – discusses Tewksbury's connection to Salinger

1923 births
2003 deaths
American television directors
American film directors
Artists from Cleveland